John W. Robinson (July 15, 1880 – July 22, 1921) was a Major League Baseball player.

Robinson attended Harvard University, where he played college baseball for the Crimson from 1899–1902.

He was born in Portland, Maine and died in Macon, Georgia.

References

External links

1880 births
1921 deaths
Major League Baseball catchers
New York Giants (NL) players
Baseball players from Maine
Harvard Crimson baseball players
Sportspeople from Portland, Maine
Minor league baseball managers
Bridgeport Orators players
Waterbury Rough Riders players
Jacksonville Jays players
Macon Brigands players
Macon Peaches players